Ursus is a biannual peer-reviewed scientific journal covering all topics about or related to bears. It is published by the International Association for Bear Research and Management.

External links
 
 Ursus on BioOne
 International Association for Bear Research and Management

Mammalogy journals
Publications established in 1968
English-language journals
Biannual journals